Britt Benae Stewart (born September 21, 1989) is an American professional dancer. She is currently a professional dancer and choreographer on Dancing with the Stars.

Early life 
Stewart was born and raised in Aurora, Colorado. She began dancing at the age of 3 at the Artistic Fusion Dance Academy. In 2000, she was accepted into the Denver School of the Arts. After graduating in 2007, she got accepted at Loyola Marymount University and moved to Los Angeles, California.

Career 
She appeared in all three High School Musical movies as a principal dancer. She was also a dancer on tours for singers Annie Lennox, Demi Lovato, Florence and the Machine, Janet Jackson, Rihanna and Selena Gomez. She was a core dancer for singer Katy Perry for three years. She danced at Super Bowl XLIX and on her Prismatic World Tour.

She appeared as a dancer in the shows Bunheads, Gilmore Girls, Grey's Anatomy, and The Voice. She was a series regular on the ABC Family show Dancing Fools.

Personal life
On February 14, 2023, Stewart confirmed her relationship with her former Dancing with the Stars partner Daniel Durant.

Dancing with the Stars 
Stewart started working on Dancing with the Stars as a troupe member on season 23. She remained in that role until season 27. She also went on tour three times for the show. She became a pro in season 29, becoming the first black female pro on the show.

In season 29, she was partnered with Olympic figure skater Johnny Weir. The couple reached the semifinals and were eliminated week 10, finishing in 6th place.

In season 30, she was partnered with actor Martin Kove. They were eliminated in the second week of competition, finishing in last place.

In season 31, she was partnered with deaf actor Daniel Durant. They reached the semifinals and were eliminated week 9, finishing in 5th place.

 Scores out of 40 are adjusted to be out of 30.

Season 29 
Celebrity partner: Johnny Weir

Season 30 
Celebrity partner: Martin Kove

Season 31 
Celebrity partner: Daniel Durant

1 Score given by guest judge Michael Buble.

Awards and achievements

References

External links 
 

1989 births
Living people
American female dancers